The men's 20 kilometres walk event at the 2010 Asian Games was held in Aoti Main Stadium, Guangzhou, China on 21 November.

Schedule
All times are China Standard Time (UTC+08:00)

Records

Results 
Legend
DSQ — Disqualified

References

Results

Athletics at the 2010 Asian Games
2010